RonReaco Lee (born August 27, 1977) is an American television and film actor best known for his roles as Tyreke Scott on the ABC/The WB sitcom Sister, Sister, and as Jamal Woodson on the BET romantic comedy Let's Stay Together. From 2014 to 2017, he starred as Reggie Vaughn in the LeBron James-executive produced Starz series Survivor's Remorse.

Career

Television
Lee was born in Decatur, Illinois, and moved to Atlanta, Georgia at age 9. He began his acting career in 1983 as the host of the short-lived television show Kid's Beat. His early work consisted of relatively minor roles in films and television, but after being cast as a mute drummer in the 1989 film Glory, his career blossomed.

By the early 1990s, Lee began receiving many guest-starring roles in television shows such as In the Heat of the Night. In 1997, he guest-starred in 413 Hope St. and Home Improvement. From 1997 to 1999, RonReaco played the part of the mechanic Tyreke "Ty" Scott in the television series Sister, Sister. On the series, Tyreke was the boyfriend of Tia Landry. At the conclusion of his role as Tyreke, Lee guest-starred on the UPN sitcom Moesha as Tate in the episode "Lets Talk About Sex." In late 2000, RonReaco continued his long string of guest-starring roles on the NBC medical drama ER playing the character of Davis.

In 2002, he guest-starred in Boston Public. Lee was seen in the short lived WB sitcom All About the Andersons and in the FX hit show The Shield, as well as the award-winning TV series Monk. In 2005, he received a recurring role as wheelchair user Todd, in NBC's short-lived comedy Committed. Lee recurred as Chris on CW's sitcom Girlfriends. He appeared frequently as David on the CBS sitcom Worst Week and played the role of Jason, Emily's husband, on short-lived series In the Motherhood.

Lee recurred as Julius Grant on the Fox show The Good Guys, and portrayed Jamal in the BET comedy Let's Stay Together from 2011 to 2014. He starred in Burn Notice: The Fall of Sam Axe, a spin-off movie based on the television series Burn Notice. Lee starred as Reggie Vaughn, Cam Calloway's cousin and manager, in the Starz original comedy Survivor's Remorse produced LeBron James. For his work on the series, Lee received two NAACP Image Award nominations for Outstanding Actor in a Comedy Series in 2016 and 2018. He portrayed Gary, an unfaithful teacher cheating on his wife, in First Wives Club. Lee recurred on Queens as the husband of Eve's character.

Film
Having made his film debut in Glory, Lee next played Omar in The Return of Swamp Thing (1989). He appeared as Chester Sayers in television film Paris Trout (1991).

He also took on a major role as Perry in the film How I Spent My Summer Vacation. In 2001, he appeared in the film Fire & Ice as co-star to Robert Aimes, Jr. That same year, he acted in the independent film Jacked Up alongside Anna Maria Horsford and Bone Thugs-N-Harmony rapper Bizzy Bone. Lee portrayed Ben in Killer Diller (2004).

Lee co-starred as Reggie in Guess Who (2005) with Bernie Mac and Ashton Kutcher. Lee played the character of Blaine in the WB comedy Americanizing Shelley (2007). He portrayed Chuck, a lawyer, in the 2009 Tyler Perry film Madea Goes to Jail. In 2020, Lee appeared as a drug dealer in Coffee & Kareem.

He now plays Miles in a play about HIV/AIDS called What You Don't Know Can Kill You.

Filmography

Film

Television

References

External links

1977 births
Male actors from Illinois
African-American male actors
American male child actors
American male film actors
American male television actors
Living people
Male actors from Atlanta
People from Decatur, Illinois
20th-century American male actors
21st-century American male actors
20th-century African-American people
21st-century African-American people